Mohammad Hoseyn Lavank (also Romanized as Moḩammad Ḩoseyn Lavānḵ) is a village in Hoseyniyeh Rural District, Alvar-e Garmsiri District, Andimeshk County, Khuzestan Province, Iran. At the 2006 census, its population was 25, in 5 families.

References 

Populated places in Andimeshk County